KKAN (1490 AM) is a radio station licensed to serve the community of Phillipsburg, Kansas. The station is owned by Robert D. Yates, Jr., through licensee RTY Broadcasting, and airs a variety/full-service format.

The station was assigned the KKAN call letters by the Federal Communications Commission on June 23, 1960.

References

External links
 Official Website
 FCC Public Inspection File for KKAN
 FCC History Card for KKAN
 

KAN
Radio stations established in 1960
1960 establishments in Kansas
Variety radio stations in the United States
Phillips County, Kansas